The 1919–20 Colgate Raiders men's basketball team represented Colgate University during the 1919–20 college men's basketball season. The head coach was William Reid, coaching the Raiders in his first season. The team had finished with a final record of 16–7. The team captain was Oscar Anderson.

Schedule

|-

References

Colgate Raiders men's basketball seasons
Colgate
Colgate
Colgate